Opportunity Center is a public alternative high school in Eugene, Oregon, United States.

History
Opportunity Center was an alternative high school program in Eugene, Oregon, until it was consolidated with other district alternative programs in the early 2010s.

In 1983, the center's first two graduates Richard Reed and Beverly Meyers, received their GED from Lane Community College.

Academics
In 2008, 43% of the school's seniors received their high school diploma. Of 69 students, 30 graduated, 19 dropped out, and 20 are still in high school.

References

Education in Eugene, Oregon
High schools in Lane County, Oregon
Alternative schools in Oregon
Public high schools in Oregon
1971 establishments in Oregon